Ignatije Midić (Serbian Cyrillic: Игнатије Мидић; born 17 October 1954) is a Serbian Orthodox bishop.

He is professor of dogmatic theology at the University of Belgrade Faculty of Theology, and a well-known contemporary orthodox theologian in Serbia. His theological conceptions are mostly influenced by St. Maxim the Confessor and John Zizioulas. The basic teaching of the Church about person, he develops not only as a separate dogmatic or ecclesiological notion, but rather he puts it in the context of the whole theology. His and John Zizioulas’ positions are well accepted but also discussed and critically reexamined by younger generation of theologians and philosophers in Serbia, especially by Aleksandar Đakovac and Davor Džalto. He became bishop in 1994 having his cathedra in Požarevac. He is the head of diocese of Požarevac and Braničevo.

On 26 June 2018, he was elected dean of the Orthodox Theological Faculty of the University of Belgrade for the period from 2018 to 2021.

References

External links

 verujem.org (Serbian)

1954 births
Living people
People from Niš
Bishops of the Serbian Orthodox Church
Serbian theologians
Eastern Orthodox theologians
Academic staff of the University of Belgrade